Thiru S.D.Somasundaram,, popularly known as S.D.S., is a veteran political leader and administrator who served as a Cabinet Minister in the State Government.

Early life and background 
Hailing from a hamlet of Sendankadu near Pattukottai town from an agricultural family, Thiru Somasundaram was an active social worker and was associated with various social organizations. Thiru S.D.S. did his engineering (B.E. mechanical ) from Annamalai University. He was a great athlete, a football player during college, and a marathon race winner representing Tamil Nadu. After graduating, S.D.S. was an assistant engineer in the public works department.

Thiru S.D.S. began his political career as an activist of the Dravidar Kazhagam in 1947 and joined the D.M.K. when the late C.N. Annadurai floated the party in 1949. He was first elected to parliament from the Thanjavur Lok Sabha constituency in Tamil Nadu in 1971 after defeating Krishnasamy Gopalar of I.N.C. (O). He was re-elected from the same constituency in 1977 on an ADMK ticket.

In 1972, he was among the first to leave the D.M.K., along with M.G. Ramachandran (M.G.R.). He was considered by the AIADMK middle and lower-level workers as a simple man who mixed with them quickly and had a reasonably clean record as a politician. M.G.R. took the activities of S.D.S. very much close to his heart. He resigned from his M.P. post in 1977 and was nominated to the now-defunct legislative council.

Mr S.D.S was an able parliamentarian and served as a Member of the Joint Committee on Salaries and Allowances of Members of Parliament during 1971–72, Committee on Private Members' Bills and Resolutions during 1973–74, House Committee in 1977 and General Purposes Committee during 1977–78. He was the first insider to question M.G.R. about the widespread corruption during his term as chief minister. As a result of differences that existed between him and M.G.R., he decided to quit AIADMK and floated his party "Namathu Kazhagam", meaning "Our party." Later he quickly folded his new party due to a lack of mass appeal and returned to the AIADMK to be in J. Jayalalitha's camp and served as revenue minister from 1991 to 1996.

Somasundaram was in charge of conducting the 8th Tamil World Conference at Thanjavur during his tenure as the revenue minister. Subsequently, due to a difference of opinion with J. Jayalalithaa, he quit AIADMK again and floated another party called "Puratchi Thalaivar AIADMK."

Mr S.D. Somasundaram died on December 6 2001, in Chennai, at 79.

Personal life 
PERARIGNAR ANNA held the marriage of SDS with Sakunthala on the 6th December ‘1962 with the presence of distinguished Dravidian party members. ANNA referred to SDS as his fraternal brother and was proud to head the wedlock. The couple has two sons. The Elder son Duraimanickam works with Chennai Port Trust as a “Superdent Engineer“, and the younger son SDS is a correspondent and political figure.

Education and political life 

Former: Member of Parliament, Revenue Minister, Government of Tamilnadu. Formerly, General Secretary of "Dravida Maanavar Munnetra Kazhagam" (the Student's Wing of Dravida Munnetra Kazhagam - DMK), Propaganda Secretary of "Anna Dravida Munnetra Kazhagam"-ADMK, Deputy General Secretary of All Indian Anna Dravida Munnetra Kazhagam-AIADMK, Founder Leader of "Namadhu Kazhagam" & Founder Leader of "Puratchi Thalaivar Anna Dravida Munnetra Kazhagam"

The rational thoughts of the legendary "THANTHAI PERIYAR" and the reformative orations of the Supreme leader "PERARIGNAR ANNA" inspired SDS, who joined their Self-respect Movement at an early age and committed to following them in their selfless efforts to eradicate untouchability, the wellbeing of the downtrodden and to hold equality among the people of the various educational and economic groups of the society for the harmony of the Dravidian people.

When "THANTHAI PERIYAR" undertook the leadership of "Dravidar Kazhagam" in 1944, SDS as a high school student, stood firm to form "Orathanadu Manavar Dravidar Kazhagam" and wore a black shirt which brought in consciousness among other students to join the Self-respect Movement.

In 1949 SDS followed "PERARIGNAR ANNA" and joined his DMK. With his hard work, this Engineering student won a place in the heart of its leader, who made SDS the first "General Secretary of "The Dravida Maanavar Munnetra Kazhagam (DMMK)". He continued as the General secretary for an entire 13-year period.

As General Secretary of DMMK and student of Annamalai University, SDS successfully conducted fourteen state DMMK conferences which sowed the seed of Anti-Hindi agitation in the hearts of the young student community.

SDS purposefully prolonged his Engineering course duration to thirteen long years at Annamalai University to propagate the ideologies of DMK to the student community of the university year after year. It's no exaggeration to say SDS was the guiding star to almost all the prominent personalities of all the DRAVIDIAN parties of Tamil Nadu. During the DMK conference held at Annamalai Nagar as General Secretary of DMMK, SDS contributed Rs.1111/- to "PERARIGNAR ANNA towards legal expenses for the Tuticorin case.

After INDIA'S independence, the separate colonies of Zamindars and Kingdoms were merged with this country under the stubborn action of the "IRON MAN of INDIA, Mr Sardar Vallabai Patel. When separate states were formed geographically and linguistically, in 1956, Mr M.P.Sivagnanam (MAA. PO. SI) fought for the Provincial Autonomy of Tamil people and Tamil Nadu. However, SDS as a student brought in great student support for the separate Dravida Naadu policy of "PERARIGNAR ANNA".

In Perarignar Anna's weekly Tamil magazines "DIRAVIDA NAADU "and "KAANCHI", he founded an English weekly under the title "HOMELAND" in the year 1957. To bring out the weekly magazine successfully, students of Annamalai University under the leadership of SDS contributed 10,000/- to "PERARIGNAR ANNA".

During the INDO -CHINA war and to everyone's astonishment, SDS gave away all the marriage gifts and cash to "PERARIGNAR ANNA" to be given as war funds. Seeing her husband's national outlook, Sakunthala Ammal also gave away all her wedding gifts and money for the war fund.

The Anti-Hindi Agitation took an aggressive step with the "Tamilnadu Students Anti-Hindi Federation" participation in 1965. When the federation needed financial support, it approached SDS. As a Government servant, he could not spare money; hence he gave all the jewels of his wife, Ms. Sakunthala Ammal, for the success of that Language - War.

In 1969 "PERARIGNAR ANNA" passed away, leaving the whole of Tamilnadu in extreme sorrow. After his death, there began internal turmoil and chaos among the second-line leaders of the DMK. As a result of this, "PURATCHI THALAIVAR Mr. M.G. Ramachandran" (MGR) was expelled from DMK. With the overwhelming support of the people, PURATCHI THALAIVAR MGR launched his political outfit "Anna Dravida Munnetra Kazhagam (ADMK)" on the 17th of October ‘1972 which party is now called "All INDIA Anna Dravida Munnetra Kazhagam (AIADMK)."

SDS joined the ANNA DMK as the first Parliament Lok Sabha Member. Along with him, SDS streamed into the new Dravidian party with many of his political followers from various other parties. Since then, SDS has worked his heart out to fight against the DMK, which was in power at that time, bearing a lousy name for corruption. SDS put forth his fullest effort to form and frame the new party from the grass-root level. Every AIADMK party member knows how hard SDSomasundaram worked to bring up the welfare of the people of Tamilnadu, and He also never rested until the work was done. He donated all his wealth and belongings to people's wellness and for funding the Tamilnadu government.

In 1973 By-election was called for the "Dindigul" Lok Sabha Constituency. Since it was just a few months before the beginning of ADMK, there was some hesitancy to contest the elections among the party's frontline leaders, But" PURATCHI THALAIVAR MGR" dared to contest the polls. He took confidence in the Propaganda Secretary of AIADMK with SD Somasundaram and made him the organizing head person of the election campaign. ADMK won the elections and got political acceptance from the people of Tamilnadu.

This victory brought SDS close to the heart of "PURATCHI THALAIVAR MGR, and they had great understanding thereon. "PURATCHI THALAIVAR MGR had SD Somasundaram as his loyal associate. Later "PURATCHI THALAIVAR MGR gave SDS a cabinet berth as Revenue Minister of Tamilnadu.

"PURATCHI THALAIVAR MGR once referred to SDS as the "Honest and Clean minster who adds revenue only to the Government and not a penny for himself in the Tamil Nadu assembly". People still refer to him as a clean politician.

After the death of ", PURATCHI THALAIVAR MGR in 1987, the political scenario in Tamilnadu took uncertainty, and AIADMK split into two factions as AIADMK (JA) under Ms Janaki Ammal and AIADMK (J) under "PURATCHI THALAIVI J. Jayalalitha".SD Somasundaram took the leadership of "PURATCHI THALAIVI AMMA" and added strength to the split party after the death of Ms Janaki amma.

SD Somasundaram played a significant part in reconvening the followers of "PURATCHI THALAIVAR MGR", who were stranded after the death of "PURATCHI THALAIVAR MGR". This work of SDS to regain the popularity of the split AIADMK impressed "PURATCHI THALAIVI AMMA", and she was given the second position at the party level. SDS toiled hard to fight and won the elections in 1991 under the Superlative leadership of "PURATCHI THALAIVI AMMA". This brought him as the loyal lieutenant of "PURATCHI THALAIVI AMMA" till his last days.

"PURATCHI THALAIVI AMMA" proudly mentioned SDS in her words during her speech at the eighth "World Tamil Conference 1995" held at Thanjavur. "SD Somasundaram is someone who never falls tired or sheds away from party work all around the clock. He is a person who always thinks about the AIADMK party and the welfare of the people of Tamilnadu. Now I call only SDS my Brother". These were the words of "PURATCHI THALAIVI AMMA" about SD Somasundaram. The closeness between them irked the eyes of others who brought the difference of opinion among them during SDS's last days.

Namathu kazhagam 
The dedicated selfless efforts towards the betterment of AIADMK and the welfare of the people of Tamilnadu gave SDS a good image among the people of this state and the party. This made“PURATCHI THALAIVAR MGR” have SDS always near him, and his loyalty assured SDS prominence in the party and Government. Such close affinity brought a hitch among other party men who wanted to break this friendship between “PURATCHI THALAIVAR MGR” and SDS. As they planned, a rift peeped out between “PURATCHI THALAIVAR MGR” and SDS. “PURATCHI THALAIVAR MGR” expelled SDS from AIADMK in 1984.

Aggrieved by this expulsion, SDS started a new political party named “Namadhu Kazhagam”.The party took off with a massive rally at Trichy in 1984. The party contested the General Election for Parliament and Tamilnadu Assembly in 1984 but could not win a single seat. In 1985 SDS regrouped the party and took a massive demonstration and Rail roko at Madurai in support of “Tamil EELAM “, for which SDS was arrested and remanded along with his followers. In 1986 SDS took up a massive procession at “Anna Saalai “in Chennai and submitted a memorandum to “The Governor “of Tamil Nadu. In 1987 when “PURATCHI THALAIVAR MGR” returned from America after treatment, on invitation, SDS met “PURATCHI THALAIVAR MGR” and merged “Namadhu Kazhagam” with AIADMK.

Last days 
S.D. Somasundaram died on 6 December 2001 in Chennai, at the age of 79.

SDS Charitable Trust 
SDS Charitable Trust is dedicated to supporting the weaker sections of society with a holistic, sustainable, and diversified approach. This charitable trust was incorporated in 2002 in memory of the late Mr. S.D.Somasundaram B.E, former Revenue minister of the Government of Tamil Nadu and Member of Parliament, who devoted his life to helping the needy. During his tenure as minister of Tamil Nadu, he brought about many revolutionary reforms in the government machinery for the betterment of the community. The trust focuses on socio-economic and educational development of backward districts and villages, with a focus on child development, youth development, women empowerment, and care and support for elderly people. Since its inception, the trust has been actively working to create a healthy society. So far, the trust has contributed to the Prime Minister's and Chief Minister's relief funds during natural disasters as needed, provided support for students' education, conducted free coaching classes to help students excel in scholarship exams, offered free computer and English skill development courses during summer and winter vacations, and provided monetary support to top performers. The "SDS Award" is given to college students who excel in both academics and sports, and the "Best Teacher Award" is given to college teachers who shape and guide the future of India.

References 

2001 deaths
All India Anna Dravida Munnetra Kazhagam politicians
Tamil Nadu ministers
People from Thanjavur district
India MPs 1971–1977
India MPs 1977–1979
Lok Sabha members from Tamil Nadu
Annamalai University alumni
Tamil Nadu MLAs 1991–1996
Year of birth missing